Săbăreni is a commune located in Giurgiu County, Muntenia, Romania. It is composed of a single village, Săbăreni.

References

Communes in Giurgiu County
Localities in Muntenia